Angerville station (French: Gare d'Angerville) is a railway station in Angerville, Île de France, France. The station was opened on 5 May 1843, and is on the Paris–Bordeaux railway line, about 75 km outside Paris.
The station is served by regional trains (TER Centre-Val de Loire) to Orléans, Étampes and Paris. The station is served by about 3 trains per day in each direction.

Gallery

References

External links

 

Railway stations in Essonne
TER Centre-Val de Loire
Railway stations in France opened in 1843